Aarumaname is a 2009 Tamil language action drama film directed by Sudheesh Sankar. The film stars Deepak, Nicole and Karthika Mathew, with Ganja Karuppu, Sudheer Sukumaran, Rajesh, Ponvannan, Sriman and Anand playing supporting roles. It was released on 31 July 2009.

Plot

The film begins with Vaithi (Deepak) running to save his elder brother Moorthy  (Sriman) from the goons. Upon his arrival, Moorthy is seriously wounded and covered with blood.

Vaithi lived with his father, Arunachalam (Rajesh), a retired teacher, his mother, and his brother Moorthy. Moorthy was a successful CPWD engineer and the pride of Arunachalam, while Vaithi was a kind-hearted auto-driver and was hated by Arunachalam. Moorthy, being an incorruptible engineer, attracted the anger of Ratnavel (Sudheer Sukumaran) and Rajadurai (Ponvannan), who were constantly trying to bribe him to get his approval for a project. In the meantime, Vaithi and Anandhi (Nicole), sister of Ratnavel and Rajadurai, fell in love with each other. The circumstances forced Moorthy to get married with Thenmozhi (Mythili), but he didn't like her.

Back to the present, Moorthy dies in the arms of Vaithi, but before dying, he pronounces the name Kadambari. Vaithi suspects Ratnavel and Rajadurai for killing his brother. A few days later, a woman (Karthika Mathew) with a baby introduces to Vaithi as Kadambari and reveals that she was Moorthy's secret wife. By pity, Vaithi accommodates them in Moorthy's outhouse. The whole village talks ill about Kadambari and Vaithi's relationship, but Vaithi keeps the secret and takes the insults of the village. Vaithi is now disowned by his father, Arunachalam, and his girlfriend has broken up with him. One day, Periyasamy (Ganja Karuppu), who witnessed his brother's murder, reveals that the killer was Kadambari's brother Boopathy (Anand), a criminal. What transpires next forms the rest of the story.

Cast

Deepak as Vaithi 
Nicole as Anandhi
Karthika Mathew as Kadambari
Ganja Karuppu as Periyasamy and Chinnasamy
Rajesh as Arunachalam
Ponvannan as Rajadurai
Sudheer Sukumaran as Ratnavel
Sriman as Moorthy
Anand as Boopathy
Mythili as Thenmozhi
Meera Krishnan as Vaithi's mother
Master Krishna Sankar as Munna
Thalaivasal Vijay as Samikannu
 Bava Lakshmanan
Muthukaalai
Arulmani as Sivasakthi

Soundtrack

The film score and the soundtrack were composed by Srikanth Deva. The soundtrack, released in 2009, features 6 tracks with lyrics written by Snehan, Kabilan and Dr. Kruthiya.

Reception
The film received mainly negative reviews with a critic stating, "Aaru Maname is a film that would make at least make it successful if ‘Theatre Projector operator’ lays his hands on the reel" but added that, "Karthika is the only solace to all the audiences". Behindwoods.com wrote, "Aaru Maname is a poorly mixed cocktail concoction that gives you an instant hangover followed by other mental complications upon consumption" and rated it 1 out of 5 stars. While another critic rated it 3 out of 5 stars and said, "Though the film had its own share of flaws, overall it has been a good attempt by the debutante team".

References

2009 films
2000s Tamil-language films
Indian action drama films
2009 directorial debut films
2009 action drama films